This is a list of Belgian television related events from 1994.

Events
Unknown - Bianca Boets wins the sixth season of VTM Soundmixshow, performing as Andrea McArdle.

Debuts

Television shows

1980s
VTM Soundmixshow (1989-1995, 1997-2000)

1990s
Samson en Gert (1990–present)
Familie (1991–present)
Wittekerke (1993-2008)

Ending this year

Births

Deaths